Streptomyces cinnabarinus is a bacterium species from the genus of Streptomyces which has been isolated from soil from a hot climate area. Streptomyces cinnabarinus produces lobocompactol.

See also 
 List of Streptomyces species

References

Further reading

External links
Type strain of Streptomyces cinnabarinus at BacDive -  the Bacterial Diversity Metadatabase

cinnabarinus
Bacteria described in 1958